Willington is a census-designated place (CDP) in McCormick County, South Carolina, United States. The population was 177 at the 2000 census.

History
The Calhoun-Gibert House and Guillebeau House are listed on the National Register of Historic Places.

Geography

Demographics

As of the census of 2000, there were 177 people, 68 households, and 43 families living in the CDP. The population density was 29.6 people per square mile (11.4/km2). There were 80 housing units at an average density of 13.4/sq mi (5.2/km2). The racial makeup of the CDP was 15.25% White, 82.49% African American and 2.26% Asian.

There were 68 households, out of which 25.0% had children under the age of 18 living with them, 41.2% were married couples living together, 22.1% had a female householder with no husband present, and 35.3% were non-families. 33.8% of all households were made up of individuals, and 14.7% had someone living alone who was 65 years of age or older. The average household size was 2.60 and the average family size was 3.41.

In the CDP, the population was spread out, with 25.4% under the age of 18, 10.7% from 18 to 24, 25.4% from 25 to 44, 24.3% from 45 to 64, and 14.1% who were 65 years of age or older. The median age was 38 years. For every 100 females, there were 96.7 males. For every 100 females age 18 and over, there were 100.0 males.

The median income for a household in the CDP was $31,429, and the median income for a family was $33,750. Males had a median income of $35,227 versus $21,250 for females. The per capita income for the CDP was $14,057. None of the families and 7.0% of the population were living below the poverty line.

2010 Census
The population of the CDP in 2010 was 142. 85.92% of the CDP was Black or African American and 14.08% was White. No one was Hispanic or Latino of any race.

References

Census-designated places in McCormick County, South Carolina
Census-designated places in South Carolina